Giliante D'Este (23 March 1910 – 24 April 1996) was an Italian rower who competed in the 1928 Summer Olympics, in the 1932 Summer Olympics, and in the 1936 Summer Olympics.

In 1928 he won the gold medal as member of the Italian boat in the coxed four event. Four years later he won the bronze medal with the Italian boat in the coxless four event. In 1936 he was part of the Italian boat which was eliminated in the repechage of the coxed four competition.

References

External links
 

1910 births
1996 deaths
People from Izola
Italian male rowers
Olympic rowers of Italy
Rowers at the 1928 Summer Olympics
Rowers at the 1932 Summer Olympics
Rowers at the 1936 Summer Olympics
Olympic gold medalists for Italy
Olympic bronze medalists for Italy
Olympic medalists in rowing
Medalists at the 1932 Summer Olympics
Medalists at the 1928 Summer Olympics
Rowers of Marina Militare
European Rowing Championships medalists